The Fremont, Elkhorn & Missouri Valley Railroad Passenger Depot, also known as the Chicago and North Western Railway Passenger Depot and presently as the Douglas Railroad Interpretive Center, was built in 1886 in Douglas, Wyoming to accommodate traffic on the Fremont, Elkhorn and Missouri Valley Railroad's (FE&MV) terminus at the newly built town. The depot was built as a fairly small, cautious investment in a possibly ephemeral frontier town. Immediately following the completion of the depot Douglas saw an epidemic of typhoid fever and the worst winter in a generation, and the railroad decided to push on to Casper for its terminus. The town's population declined from 1600 in 1886 to 900 in 1888. By 1891 Owen Wister reported that Douglas had a population of about 350. However, by 1910 Douglas had 2246 residents and hosted the Wyoming State Fair. The presence of the fair stimulated rail traffic, while the FE&MV merged with the Cheyenne and Northern Railway in 1903. In 1905 oil development started. In the 1950s coal mining began for the Dave Johnson Power Plant and the railway expanded its Douglas facilities to accommodate the traffic, closing the original depot and building a larger facility. The depot was acquired from the railroad's successor, the Chicago and North Western Railway, by the city in 1990.

Description
Like most such depots, the station has a protruding bay on the long side facing the track to allow the stationmaster to see up and down the line. The interior has five spaces: a waiting room, an office, bathrooms, freight handling and freight storage. The interior woodwork is intact.

The depot was placed on the National Register of Historic Places on August 3, 1994. The town has developed the depot as the Douglas Railroad Interpretive Center with displays of locomotives and railroad cars and equipment. The display opened in 1995.

References

External links
 Fremont, Elkhorn & Missouri Valley Railroad Passenger Depot at the Wyoming State Historic Preservation Office
 Locomotive Park website

National Register of Historic Places in Converse County, Wyoming
Victorian architecture in Wyoming
Railway stations in the United States opened in 1887
Museums in Converse County, Wyoming
Douglas
Railway stations on the National Register of Historic Places in Wyoming
Douglas, Wyoming
Former railway stations in Wyoming